Sambhavanatha was the third Jain tirthankara (omniscient teaching god) of the present age (Avasarpini). Sambhavanatha was born to King Jitari and Queen Susena at Sravasti. His birth date was the fourteenth day of the Margshrsha shukla month of the Indian calendar. Like all arihant (omniscient beings), Sambhavanatha at the end of his life destroyed all associated karmas and attained moksha (liberation).

Life
Sambhavanatha was the third tirthankara (omniscient Jain teacher) of the present age (Avasarpini). He was born to King Jitārī and Queen Susena at Sravasti. in the Ikshvaku dynasty. His height was 400 dhanusa (1,200 meters). Sambavanatha is associated with Horse emblem, Sala tree, Trimukha (three-faced) Yaksha and Prajnapthi & Duritari Yakshi.

According to Jain text Uttarapurāṇa, Sambhavanatha possessed three types of knowledge from birth.

Prayer 
Svayambhustotra by Acarya Samantabhadra is the adoration of twenty-four tirthankaras. Its five slokas (aphorisms) adore the qualities of Sambhavanātha.

Main Temples
 Shobhnath temple: birthplace of Sambhavanatha
 Chaturmukha Basadi, Gerusoppa
 Sambhavanath Temple in Idar, Gujarat

See also

God in Jainism
Arihant (Jainism)
Jainism and non-creationism

Notes

References
 
 
 
 
 
 

Tirthankaras
Solar dynasty
People from Uttar Pradesh
Ancient Indian people